The 2019 Stanford Cardinal baseball team represented Stanford University in the 2019 NCAA Division I baseball season. The Cardinal play their home games at Klein Field at Sunken Diamond under second year coach David Esquer.

Previous season
The Cardinal finished 46-12 overall with a 22-8 conference record. They started the 2018 season 10-0 with sweeps over Cal-State Fullerton and Rice and then finishing the regular season winning the Pac-12 conference and the automatic bid to the NCAA Tournament.

Ranked 1 in the Cal State Fullerton Super Regional, the Cardinal beat Wright State and Baylor, but would lose to Cal State Fullerton twice, throughout the Super Regional, losing the Regional.

2018 MLB Draft

The Cardinal had five individuals selected in the 2018 MLB draft.

 Duke Kinamon did not sign with the New York Mets.

Roster

Schedule and results

Rankings based on team's current ranking in the D1Baseball poll.
Source:

Stanford Regional

Statistics

Batting
Note: G = Games played; AB = At bats; R = Runs scored; H = Hits; 2B = Doubles; 3B = Triples; HR = Home runs; RBI = Runs batted in; BB = Base on balls; SO = Strikeouts; AVG = Batting average; SB = Stolen bases

Pitching
Note: W = Wins; L = Losses; ERA = Earned run average; G = Games pitched; GS = Games started; SV = Saves; IP = Innings pitched; H = Hits allowed; R = Runs allowed; ER = Earned runs allowed; HR = Home runs allowed; BB = Walks allowed; K = Strikeouts

Rankings

References

Stanford
Stanford Cardinal baseball seasons
Stanford Cardinal
Stanford